La Souriante Madame Beudet (The Smiling Madame Beudet) is a short French impressionist silent film made in 1923, directed by pioneering avant-garde cinema director Germaine Dulac. It stars Germaine Dermoz as Madame Beudet and Alexandre Arquillière as Monsieur Beudet. It is considered by many to be one of the first truly "feminist" films. It tells the story of an intelligent woman trapped in a loveless marriage.

Synopsis
Monsieur Beudet frequently puts an empty revolver to his head and threatens to shoot himself as a practical joke or to emphasize his frustration. He does this so often that it no longer surprises his wife or friends. One night, Monsieur Beudet gets some theater tickets, but his wife refuses to go with him. While he is gone, Madame Beudet spends some time reflecting on her marriage to a slovenly, unromantic man who does things like lock the lid of her piano when he's upset with her; she puts a bullet into her husband's revolver so he will accidentally kill himself the next time he repeats his joke.

After a sleepless night, Madame Beudet comes to feel remorse for the trap she has set. Unfortunately, that day Monsieur Beudet's office is never unoccupied long enough for her to remove the bullet from the revolver. Monsieur Beudet calls for his wife to ask her about some large household expenses. He gets worked up and, thinking the revolver is empty like it usually is, he points it at himself and then turns it on his wife. He shoots, but the bullet misses Madame Beudet. Monsieur Beudet wrongly surmises that his wife was trying to commit suicide. He embraces her and says "How could I live without you?"

Cast
Germaine Dermoz as Madame Beudet
Alexandre Arquillière as Monsieur Beudet
Jean d'Yd as Monsieur Labas
Madeleine Guitty as Madame Labas
Raoul Paoli as Le champion de tennis

See also 
Lists of French films
Women's cinema

References

External links 

The Importance of Being a Film Author: Germaine Dulac and Female Authorship (by Rosanna Maule, Senses of Cinema

1923 films
French silent short films
French black-and-white films
1920s feminist films
French feminist films
French films based on plays
1923 drama films
Articles containing video clips
French drama films
Films about suicide
Silent drama films
1920s French films
1920s French-language films